Tundavala Gap (in Portuguese, Fenda da Tundavala) is a viewpoint in the rim of the great escarpment called Serra da Leba. It is located some 18 km from the city of Lubango, in Huíla province, Angola.

The escarpment marks the western limit of Bié Plateau. The altitude at the rim exceeds 2200 m, while the plain below is approximately 1200 m lower, which creates a rather impressive view, encompassing a distance of tens of kilometers.

Tundavala National Stadium, in Lubango, which hosted the matches of Group D in the 2010 African Cup of Nations is named after Tundavala Gap.

Mountains of Angola